William Speer may refer to:

William Speer (politician) (1818–1900), Australian politician
William Speer (minister), American Presbyterian missionary and pastor
Bill Speer (1942–1989), Canadian ice hockey player